Janet L. Holmgren is the president of Patten University.  Previously, she was the president of Mills College in Oakland, California from 1991 to 2011. She was previously vice provost at Princeton University   from 1988 to 1991. Before that, she was an administrator and professor at the University of Maryland. She holds a B.A. in English, summa cum laude, from Oakland University (Rochester, MI), 1968, a M.A. in Linguistics (1971) and a  Ph.D. in Linguistics, Princeton University, 1974.

Honors
Honorary degree, Golden Gate University, 1995
Honorary degree, Mount Vernon College, Washington DC, 1992
Award for Excellence in Education, California National Organization for Women, 2002
Donna Shavlik Leadership Award for Lifetime Service, Office of Women in Higher Education, American Council on Education, 2001

Professional activities
Trustee, Princeton University
Board of Directors Carnegie Foundation for the Advancement of Teaching (and Past Chair)
Board of Directors, National Council for Research on Women   (and Past Chair)
Executive Board, Women's College Coalition (and Past Chair)
Board of Directors American Council on Education –Executive Committee
Executive Committee, Association of Independent California Colleges and Universities (and Past Chair)
Advisory Council, California Academy of Science
Master Plan Committee for Education in California
Advisory Council, California Academy of Science

References

Living people
Year of birth missing (living people)
Oakland University alumni
Princeton University alumni
University of Maryland, College Park faculty
Princeton University faculty
Presidents of Mills College